Erythranthe lewisii (Lewis' monkeyflower, great purple monkeyflower) is a perennial plant in the family Phrymaceae. It is named in honor of explorer Meriwether Lewis.  Together with other species in Erythranthe, it serves as a model system for studying pollinator-based reproductive isolation. It was formerly known as Mimulus lewisii.

Description
Erythranthe lewisii is a  perennial herb, with stem length ranging from 25 to 80 cm and individual leaves ranging from 20 to 70 mm.  The vegetative tissue is covered with fine hairs.  The flowers are medium in size, set on fairly long (30–70 mm) pedicels, and range in color from pale pink (generally found in the Sierra Nevada populations, sometimes separated as Erythranthe erubescens G.L.Nesom) to dark magenta (more common in the Cascade Range and Rocky Mountains populations), with a central pair of carotenoid-rich yellow nectar guides covered in trichomes on the lower lobe of the corolla.  Occasional populations of white-flowered individuals (which do not express anthocyanin pigments in the corolla) are known.

Distribution and habitat
Erythranthe lewisii is native to western North America from Alaska to California to Colorado, where it grows in moist habitat such as stream banks, and is generally found at higher elevations in montane areas.

Pollination
Erythranthe lewisii is pollinated by bees (primarily Bombus and Osmia), which feed off of its nectar and transfer its pollen.  Although it is fully interfertile with its sister species, E. cardinalis, the two do not interbreed in the wild, a difference ascribed primarily to pollinator differences (E. cardinalis is pollinated by hummingbirds) in areas of overlap.

Uses 
This plant is cultivated as an ornamental in mild or coastal areas, as it does not tolerate prolonged freezing. In the UK it has gained the Royal Horticultural Society's Award of Garden Merit. It prefers a very damp soil in full sunlight.

Native Americans ate the leaves of the plant.

References

External links
Jepson Manual Treatment
USDA Plants Profile
Photo gallery

lewisii
Flora of the West Coast of the United States
Flora of Alaska
Flora of California
Flora of British Columbia
Flora of the Cascade Range
Flora of the Sierra Nevada (United States)
Medicinal plants
Flora without expected TNC conservation status